Docklands, also known as Melbourne Docklands, is an inner-city suburb in Melbourne, Victoria, Australia,  west of Melbourne's Central Business District, located within the City of Melbourne local government area. Docklands recorded a population of 15,495 at the 2021 census.

Primarily a waterfront area centred on the banks of the Yarra River, it is bounded by Wurundjeri Way and the Charles Grimes Bridge to the east, CityLink to the west and Lorimer Street across the Yarra to the south.

The site of modern-day Docklands was originally swamp land that in the 1880s became a bustling dock area as part of the Port of Melbourne, with an extensive network of wharfs, heavy rail infrastructure and light industry. Following the containerisation of shipping traffic, Docklands fell into disuse and by the 1990s was virtually abandoned, making it the focal point of Melbourne's underground rave scene. The construction of Docklands Stadium in the late 1990s attracted developer interest in the area, and urban renewal began in earnest in 2000 with several independent privately developed areas overseen by VicUrban, an agency of the Victorian Government. Docklands subsequently experienced an apartment boom and became a sought-after business address, attracting the national headquarters of, among others, the National Australia Bank, ANZ, Myer, Medibank, and the Bureau of Meteorology, as well as the regional headquarters for Ericsson, Bendigo Bank and television networks Channel Nine and Seven Network Broadcast Centre.

Known for its striking contemporary architecture, the suburb is home to a number of heritage buildings that have been retained for adaptive reuse, and is also the site of landmarks such as the aforementioned Docklands Stadium, Southern Cross Station and the Melbourne Star Observation wheel.

Although still incomplete, Docklands' developer-centric planning has split public opinion with some lamenting its lack of green open space, pedestrian activity, transport links and culture.

History

Early history

Before the foundation of Melbourne, Docklands was a wetlands area consisting of a large salt lake and a giant swamp (known as West Melbourne Swamp) at the mouth of the Moonee Ponds Creek. It was one of the open hunting grounds of the Wurundjeri people, who created middens around the edges of the lake.

At Melbourne's foundation, John Batman set up his home on Batman's Hill at Docklands, marking the westernmost point of the settlement. However, the rest of the area remained largely unused for decades.

The advent of rail infrastructure in the late 1860s saw the city's industry gradually expand into the area.

The earliest extensive plans to develop the area was in the 1870s, when a plan was prepared to extend the Hoddle Grid westward, following the curve of the Yarra River and effectively doubling its size. The plan proposed several gridlike blocks with an ornamental public garden and lake in the shape of the United Kingdom, occupying the site of the salt lake. However, expansion of the grid westward was abandoned in favor of a northward extension.

Construction of Victoria Dock

Under the guidance of British civil engineer John Coode, a major engineering project began in the 1880s to reroute the course of the Yarra River, which resulted in the widening of the river for shipping and the creation of a new Victoria Dock (the name was previously used by one at Queens Bridge as early as the 1850s). The dock was lined with wharves and light industry grew around the nearby western rail yards of Spencer Street railway station (now Southern Cross railway station), which were used for freighting the goods inland.

Early to mid 20th century

During the wars, Victoria Dock was used as the main port for naval vessels and most of the Victorian troops returned from both wars to the docks.

By the 1920s, with shipping moved from the Yarra turning basin at Queensbridge, Victoria Dock and surrounding port had become Melbourne's busiest.

Disuse and rave epicentre
With the introduction of containerisation of Victoria's shipping industry in the 1950s and 1960s, the docks along the Yarra River, east of the modern Bolte Bridge, and within Victoria Harbour immediately to the west of the Central Business District, became inadequate for the new container ships.

The creation of Appleton Dock and Swanson Dock in an area west of the Moonee Ponds Creek, now known as West Melbourne, closer to the mouth of the Yarra, became the focus of container shipping, effectively rendering redundant a vast amount of vacant inner-city land to the immediate west of Melbourne's CBD.

Docklands became notable during the 1990s for its underground rave dance scene. The growth of the warehouse rave scene carried on from the earlier gay and lesbian warehouse party scene which had started in the early 1980s, and continued in the Docklands through parties such as The ALSO Foundation's Red Raw, Winterdaze, New Year's Eve, and Resurrection dance parties.

The site was also host to a number of dance parties by Future Entertainment and Hardware Corporation. DJs and performers such as Paul van Dyk, Carl Cox, Jeff Mills, Frankie Knuckles, David Morales, Marshall Jefferson and BT headlined these events. The biggest event hosted, in terms of attendance, was the "Welcome 2000" New Year's Eve dance party hosted on 31 December 1999.

Urban renewal

Docklands was seen as a large urban blight by the Cain Jr. State Government. Property consultants JLW Advisory carried out the first market demand assessment of the site.

The size of the Melbourne Docklands area meant that political influences were inescapable. The Docklands project was on top of the government's agenda, however, due to the poor condition of the wharf infrastructure, a further investment was required to initiate the project, which the government at the time could not afford. Nevertheless, the Docklands project stayed on the drawing board, but with little progress. In 1989, several architectural firms were invited to discuss how the area could best serve the Melbourne public.

In 1990, the Docklands Task Force was established to devise an infrastructure strategy and conduct the public consultation process. The Committee For Melbourne, a not for profit organization that brought together the private sector of Melbourne for a public good, was pursuing another planning strategy. It involved a bid for the Olympic Games and another proposal to turn the Docklands into a technology city, known as the Multifunction Polis (MFP). Both bids fell through in late 1990. Nevertheless, the Committee For Melbourne's approach became the preferred model in the proceeding strategies for the Docklands development, leading to the formation of the Docklands Authority in July 1991.

Kennett era 
With a government running in budget deficits, not much progress was made on the Docklands project. In late 1992, Jeff Kennett was elected Premier. Kennett instituted many changes and turned the government's financial position around. He then embarked on a multitude of projects, which included Docklands. It was politically imperative to get the project rolling, the Docklands Authority opted for the concept of having leaving all design and funding of infrastructure to the developers. The development industry supported this, and claimed that the project would be more efficient. Docklands was divided into sections or precincts, which were to be tendered to private companies to be developed.

May 1996 saw the relaunch of the tender process. Few restrictions were applied to the bids from developers, and as the vision was to make Docklands 'Melbourne's Millennium Mark', the key criterion for a successful bid was to get projects going by 2000. It did not take long for the realisation that the lack of government coordination in infrastructure planning would create problems. Developers would not invest into public infrastructure, where benefits would flow on to an adjacent property. This was corrected by allowing developers to negotiate for infrastructure funding with the government. The Docklands Village precinct was planned for a residential and commercial mixed development, but, in late 1996, that plan was scrapped when it was announced a private football stadium would be built on the site. The site was chosen for its easy access to the then Spencer Street Station (now Southern Cross Station), and it was intended to be an anchor for the entire project and provide for a clear signal to the long-awaited start of the Docklands project. However, this would create a huge barrier between the City and Docklands.

In 1997, the Docklands commission engaged architects Ashton Raggatt McDougall to design the Docklands masterplan.

With the exception of Yarra Waters (later Yarra's Edge) bid by Mirvac, bid for every other precinct between 1998 and 1999 fell through, reasons for which were often unclear due to secrecy provisions and a change of government.

Through the tendering process for the sites, the business park was split once more and awarded to two consortia, becoming Entertainment City (renamed Paramount Studios) - a movie theme park with film studios, to be developed by a Viacom led consortium, and Yarra Nova (which later evolved into NewQuay), to the MAB Corporation consortium. The Paramount Studios proposal fell through, and the site was put to tender once more, as Studio City, and later awarded as two parts, becoming what is now the Central City Studios and Waterfront City.

Yarra Waters/Yarra Quays was awarded to Mirvac, later becoming Yarra's Edge.

The technology park was renamed Commonwealth Technology Port (or Comtech Port) before finally becoming Digital Harbour.

A number of other sites also encountered false starts, with Victoria Harbour originally being awarded to Walker Corporation, before being put out to tender again and finally being awarded to Lendlease in April 2001. The Batman's Hill precinct was originally awarded to Grocon, which had plans for what would have been the world's tallest building rising 560 m, dubbed Grollo Tower and featuring a mix of office, apartment, hotel and retail. This deal also fell through with the site being subdivided into 15 parcels as well as No 2 Goods Shed.

On 1 July 2007 Docklands became part of the City of Melbourne Local Government Authority, however, VicUrban retained planning authority until 2010.

Heritage

Significant heritage buildings include the No 2 Goods Shed (now a mixed use development), former railway offices at 67 Spencer Street (now the Grand Hotel), The Mission to Seafarers building, Victoria Dock and Central Pier, Queens Warehouse (adaptively reused as a vintage car museum), Docklands Park gantry crane and a small number of warehouses and container sheds.

Districts

The area is broken up into a number of precincts, which are each being designed and built by a different development company.

Batman's Hill
The Batman's Hill precinct is bordered by the Yarra River to the south, Spencer Street to the east, Docklands Stadium to the north and Victoria Harbour to the west. The precinct is named after the historical landmark Batman's Hill, which was once located within the area.

It is a mixed-use precinct including commercial and retail space, entertainment, hotels, residential sections, restaurants, cultural sites and educational institutions as well as the historic Rail Goods Shed No. 2, which was split in half to allow for the extension of Collins Street into Docklands, providing businesses with an address that is considered to be prestigious. The area is 100,000 square metres.

More than half the precinct is already built, committed or under construction, and includes the Watergate/Site One apartment and small office complex, 700 Collins Street (home to the Bureau of Meteorology and Medibank), 750 Collins Street (the Melbourne headquarters of AMP), Kangan Institute's Automotive Centre for Excellence (ACE) and the Fox Classic Car Museum, 717 Bourke Street (consisting of a 294-room Travelodge Hotel) and 737 Bourke Street (home to National Foods).

On 2 August 2007, it was reported that a $1.5 billion scheme had been earmarked for Collins Street by Middle Eastern investment company Sama Dubai, to be designed by architect Zaha Hadid and Melbourne firm Ashton Raggatt McDougall. The plan would consist of four buildings, including Docklands' tallest tower as well as civic spaces spanning two sites to be built on decking over Wurundjeri Way. The proposed tower will be between 50 and 60 storeys tall but did not proceed and VicUrban put the site back out to tender in early 2011.

The offices of Fairfax Media are at 643 Collins Street. The new building, known as Media House, comprises 16,000 m2 of office space accommodating 1,400 staff, on decking over railway lines opposite Southern Cross Station. The $110 million eight-storey facility was designed by architects Bates Smart to achieve a 5-star Green Star rating, and will feature a news ticker, outdoor screen and grassy plaza. It was developed by Grocon in 2009.

Collins Square

Collins Square (previously Village Docklands) is a ~2Ha site within the Batman's Hill precinct. It was developed by Walker Corporation.

Collins Square is the outcome of a split of precincts in the tender process in 2000, which resulted in Goods Shed South, 735 Collins Street and Sites 4A-4F, originally awarded to the Kuok Group and Walker Corporation.

A masterplan prepared by Marchese + Partners in conjunction with Bligh Voller Nield architects was approved in early 2002. It included a 60-storey Shangri-La Hotels and Resorts tower with a Collins Street address and a mix of commercial and residential towers, as well as the refurbishment of the southern half of Goods Shed No. 2 into a night market and food hall.

In mid-2007, a new masterplan was prepared by Bates Smart. In it a new 38-storey office tower replaced the Shangri La Hotel on Collins Street and the number of streets is reduced from four to three, replaced by pedestrian thoroughfares. Overall there will now be five office buildings, ranging in height from 155m (to roof) to 36m, a 10,000sqm retail and public space, and the refurbishment of the Goods Shed with a 'Lantern' structure addressing Collins Street. The entire precinct is aiming for a 5 Star Green Star rating.

Construction of Collins Square was completed in 2018.

Stadium Precinct

The Stadium Precinct, which sits on the eastern edge of Docklands, consists of Docklands Stadium, Seven Network's Melbourne digital broadcasting centre, Victoria Point, Bendigo Bank offices and Quest serviced apartments. It is linked to Southern Cross station and the Melbourne CBD by the Bourke Street pedestrian bridge, built over railway lines.

During the 2000 Docklands development tender process, the stadium precinct was divided into four corners, the North West Stadium Precinct (NWSP), North East Stadium Precinct (NESP), South East Stadium Precinct (SESP) and South West Stadium Precinct (SWSP). The NWSP was awarded to Channel 7/Pacific Holdings. The NESP was awarded to Pan Urban. The SWSP was awarded to Devine Limited/RIA Property Group and the SESP - Bourke Junction Consortium (ISPT, CBUS Property and EPC Partners).

Docklands Stadium (originally Colonial Stadium) was opened in March 2000. The ability for the structure to have both open and closed roof configurations has seen it host many sports events, including Australian Rules Football, soccer, cricket and rugby as well as concerts. The stadium complex is currently managed by Stadium Operations Ltd, which is owned by the Seven Network, with ownership transferring to the Australian Football League in 2025.

Developer Pan Urban has announced plans for a $300 million twin-tower apartment development, known as Lacrosse Docklands, for the NESP, with the towers set to rise 21 and 18 storeys respectively, above the stadium concourse, with restaurants and bars opening out on to the concourse, forming a retail plaza.

Plans for the site to be known as Bourke Junction include office towers of 29 and 21 storeys on the north-eastern and south-western corners of the SESP site, as well as three lower-rise buildings housing a 250-room hotel, a pub, medical centre, retail facilities, a business club and a two-level gymnasium.

Digital Harbour at Comtechport Precinct

Digital Harbour is a waterfront that has an area of 44,000 square metres, with development intended to expand to include 220,000 square metres of commercial, residential, SOHO units and retail space. At present only three buildings have been completed; 1010 LaTrobe Street/Port 1010 (home to VicTrack, Australian Customs and Border Protection Service), and the Innovation Building (home of the Telstra Learning Academy and Innovation Centre). A third building, Life.lab currently resides at 198 Harbour Esplanade, while a fourth, 1000 LaTrobe Street, is expected to commence shortly.

Port 1010 received the Commercial Architecture Award at the 2007 Victorian Architecture Awards, held on Friday 13 July.

The Digital Harbour Business Association was launched in 2011. This is a group of businesses established in the Digital Harbour precinct in the Docklands. The precinct is a destination for IT, Media and other related businesses. The aim of the association is to promote the businesses within Digital Harbour to the wider Docklands Community and the Melbourne CBD.

Victoria Harbour

The Victoria Harbour Precinct is the centrepiece of Docklands. The precinct includes a proposed extension of Collins Street and Bourke Street to meet at the water's edge. It has an area of 280,000 square metres, with 3.7 kilometres of waterfront. The 12-year construction plans for Victoria Harbour include residential apartments, commercial office space, retail space, community facilities and the development of public spaces such as Grand Plaza, Harbour Esplanade, Docklands Park and Central Pier.

One of the first completed office buildings in the precinct was the colourful National Australia Bank (NAB) headquarters, located at 800 Bourke Street, which accommodates approximately 3,600 staff. The building has large open floor plates, an atria, a campus-style workplace and a four-star energy rating.

Almost 1,000 Ericsson employees also call Victoria Harbour home, with the company's new Melbourne offices at 818 Bourke Street. Ericsson House sits on the water's edge next door to the National Australia Bank HQ and Dock 5 apartments

The first residential tower to be built at Victoria Harbour was Dock 5. Rising 30 storeys, it was designed by Melbourne firm John Wardle Architects and HASSELL. Dock 5 derives its name from its location, which was known as Dock 5.

The Gauge, at 825 Bourke Street, will house the new offices of developer Lend Lease and Fujitsu. The eight-storey building was designed to achieve a six-star energy rating, becoming the second building in Docklands to do so.

A Safeway supermarket opened in Merchant Street (opposite The Gauge) in 2008, along with a number of other retail tenancies at street level, including Australia Post, a childcare centre, and offices above, which have been occupied by LUCRF Super and the National Union of Workers since 2008.

In 2009 the Australia and New Zealand Banking Group's (ANZ) new world headquarters at 833 Collins Street have was completed. The office complex includes shops, car parking facilities and a YMCA. It enables 6,500 ANZ staff to work in one integrated area. The new ANZ headquarters, designed by HASSELL and developed by Lend Lease, was expected to become the largest office complex in Australia. Construction commenced in late 2006. It has been designed to achieve a six-star energy rating.

In 2007, Myer announced that it had chosen Victoria Harbour as the location for its new Corporate Store Support Offices. The new offices were built at 800 Collins Street, opposite ANZ.

NewQuay

NewQuay, opened in 2002, was one of the first residential and commercial developments in Docklands. It is a mixed-use precinct comprising a number of private residential, hotel accommodation, serviced apartment and retail/commercial properties, developed by the MAB Corporation. The flagship building, Palladio - which is shaped like the prow of a ship - is named after Italian architect Andrea Palladio. The podium building, Sant'Elia is named after another Italian architect, Antonio Sant'Elia. Other buildings are named after Australian artists: Nolan (Sidney Nolan), Arkley (Howard Arkley), Boyd (Arthur Boyd), and Conder (Charles Conder). In 2013, the construction of the twin residential towers "The Quays" was completed.

Aquavista, completed in May 2007, is a strata office development and the first commercial building to be completed in NewQuay, as part of the HQ NewQuay development. Another, the seven-storey 370 Docklands Drive, is currently under construction, with a further two buildings - Lots 5 & 9 - currently under design development.

On 17 October 2007, MAB Corporation launched 'The Avenues at NewQuay' development, consisting of three-storey townhouse residences, with park and waterfront frontages, to be built as part of NewQuay's western precinct. The development is being designed by Plus Architecture.

The ground level podiums contain a commercial precinct with a variety of restaurants and cafes including Italian, Indian, Middle Eastern, Cantonese, Moroccan, Cambodian and Modern Australian cuisines.

Yarra's Edge

Yarra's Edge is a residential precinct being developed by Mirvac, and the only Docklands precinct south of the Yarra River. When complete, it will consist of 11 apartment towers, costing A$1.3 billion, and cover 0.15 km2.

Yarra's Edge was one of the first developments in Docklands, with construction of Tower 1 commencing in 2000. It is divided into 3 smaller precincts:

The Marina Precinct - Comprising the marina and boardwalk, with six residential towers ranging in height from 25 to 47 storeys

The Park Precinct - Comprising Point Park and two residential towers

The River Precinct - Comprising a mix of lower-level, less intense terrace-style developments and three high-rise towers towards the Bolte Bridge

To date only five apartment towers have been completed, as well as the RekDek (located in the podium of Tower 1 and featuring a gymnasium and 25-metre lap pool), a public promenade, Point Park (with an outlook towards the Melbourne CBD) and a mix of restaurants, cafes and retail, including a day spa and a convenience store. Yarra's Edge also has a 175-berth marina, giving boat owners previously unavailable proximity to Crown Casino and the city.

Webb Bridge is a bridge designed by Denton Corker Marshall, in collaboration with artist Robert Owen, forming a cycling and pedestrian link to the main part of Docklands, through Docklands Park. It is the conversion of the former Webb Bridge rail link. The bridge is near the Charles Grimes Bridge, over the Yarra.

Waterfront City

Waterfront City is a shopping and entertainment area that includes The District Docklands shopping mall, Melbourne Star Observation wheel, Icehouse ice sports and entertainment centre, and numerous shops and cafes which are centred on this area.

The precinct features an integration of retail, waterfront entertainment, tourism, dining, commercial and urban community. It has an area of 193,000 square metres.

Stage One was completed in December 2005, in time for the Melbourne stopover of the Volvo Ocean Race in January – February 2006 and the Commonwealth Games in March 2006. The precinct originally featured a large circus tent, which hosted the International Circus Spectacular, as well as a mosaic of local entertainers and a number of bronze statues, including Kylie Minogue, John Farnham, Graham Kennedy, Nellie Melba and Dame Edna Everage.

Waterfront city is home to Australia's first Costco Warehouse Store.

In May 2017 Lord Mayor Robert Doyle and Planning Minister Richard Wynne visited The District Docklands to announce a $150 million redevelopment of the centre including an eight-screen Hoyts cinema, which opened in 2018, and a full-line Woolworths supermarket due mid-2019.

During 2017–2018, a collaboration between The District Docklands and Renew Australia allowed the creation of an initiative called the Docklands Art Collective, which made a wing of The District Docklands complex available at very low rents to arts businesses and galleries. These included a photography studio, a puppetry workshop, a comics retailer and printery, a recycled art paper maker and the relocated Blender Studios.

Melbourne Central City Studios

When it opened in 2004, Central City Studios became Melbourne's largest film and television studio complex. The site is located approximately 2 km north west of the Central Business District. It has an area of 60,000 square meters and currently consists of five film and television sound stages.

The first major contract for the new studios was the American film Ghost Rider in 2005; with a budget of nearly $120 million, at the time it was the biggest feature film to be made in Victoria and features scenes involving Melbourne landmarks. Since then the studios have housed many international productions.

In 2009 the Government of Victoria, together with the Studios, undertook the Future Directions project. This resulted in the State Government committing the Studios to focus on both the international and domestic film and television industries. Further developments to the infrastructure of the site are planned, including a sixth sound stage.

On 11 October 2010 the studios were re-branded as Docklands Studios Melbourne, formally adopting the name by which the studios were commonly known.

Public Art

There are approximately 68 pieces of public art in the Docklands Precincts, with works from Australian and New Zealand artists. There are self-guided tours and maps available for the public to discover the artworks.

Transport

Docklands has access to road, rail and water transports.

Docklands Highway or Wurundjeri Way is the main road bordering Docklands. It connects to the nearby Westgate Freeway on the southern end and links to the CBD including extensions from Flinders Street, Collins Street and La Trobe Street.

Southern Cross station, near the eastern edge of Docklands, is the closest passenger railway station. It is also the major interchange for metropolitan and intercity rail. Much of Docklands area remains covered by rail yards previously used for freight transport and rolling stock which are being progressively reclaimed or built over.

Trams in Docklands include the free City Circle tram, along Docklands Drive and to and from Waterfront City. As Docklands has developed, tram routes have been extended and rerouted into the area. Route 70 also runs to Waterfront City. Route 75 runs along Harbour Esplanade, terminating at Footscray Road. Routes 11 and 48 run along Collins Street to Victoria Harbour. Route 30 enters Docklands via La Trobe Street, terminating at the north end of Harbour Esplanade. Route 86 runs along La Trobe Street and Docklands Drive, terminating at Waterfront City.

Docklands also includes major pedestrian links with a concourse extending from Bourke Street and extensive promenades along the waterfront, including the wide Harbour Esplanade.

Several offroad bicycle paths run through Docklands, all of which connect through the central spine of Webb Bridge, Docklands Park and Harbour Esplanade, connecting Melbourne City Centre to the inner western suburbs and the Capital City Trail.

There are also three ferry terminals which connect Docklands to the Melbourne City Centre and inner bayside suburbs. One at Victoria Harbour, one at NewQuay and one at Yarra's Edge.

Sports 
 The Docklands Stadium (currently known as Marvel Stadium), located just northwest of the Southern Cross railway station, is the home ground to five AFL football clubs (St Kilda, North Melbourne, Carlton, Essendon and Western Bulldogs), one A-League soccer club (Melbourne Victory), and one Big Bash League cricket team (Melbourne Renegades), and was briefly the home for the Melbourne Storm rugby team.  It was also the one of the venues for the 2003 Rugby World Cup and the 2006 Commonwealth Games, and hosted the 2015 Speedway Grand Prix of Australia.
 The O'Brien Icehouse, located between the Moonee Ponds Creek (accessible via the creek trail) and the Melbourne Star observation wheel, is the largest ice sports venue and the only dual-rink facility in Australia.  It is the home to both of the two Victorian AIHL ice hockey teams, the Melbourne Ice and Melbourne Mustangs.
 The Docklands Sports Courts is a public urban park on Harbour Esplanade featuring two mixed-use court for basketball, netball, soccer/futsal and dodgeball and an outdoor ping-pong table, as well as children's play parks and shading parasols.  The Docklands Park is across the Esplanade, offering more green spaces with bicycle trails.
 Lasersports Australia operates a booking-based laser clay shooting business at New Quay.

Demographics and industry
In the 2016 Census, there were 10,964 people in Docklands. 27.3% of people were born in Australia. The most common countries of birth were China 16.5%, India 12.7%, South Korea 3.1%, Malaysia 2.6% and England 2.3%. 34.4% of people only spoke English at home. Other languages spoken at home included Mandarin 18.3%, Hindi 4.9%, Cantonese 3.1%, Korean 2.9% and Telugu 2.4%. The most common response for religion in Docklands (State Suburbs) was No Religion at 38.1%.

Of the occupied private dwellings in Docklands, 97.1% were flats or apartments and 2.3% were semi-detached, row or terrace houses, townhouses, etc.

In 2009, there were just under 10,000 working mostly in office and retail industries.

In the 2021 Census, the Docklands had grown to a population of 15,495 people.

Local media

The precinct has two publications, Docklands News and 3008 Docklands Magazine.

The Docklands Community News' first edition was published in 2003, and both DCN & 3008 Docklands Magazine have grown with the Docklands precincts' population. Both publications are printed and distributed to all businesses and residences within Docklands, which allows for a regular readership of over 10,000. The DCN paper informs the community of relevant news relating to Docklands as well as supplying residents, business owners and workers with a platform for community discussion.

3008 Docklands Magazine also covers all matters relating to the Docklands community and businesses, but also covers events and news pertaining to Melbourne City and the surrounding suburbs, as Docklands is under the jurisdiction of the City of Melbourne. 3008 Docklands Magazine is a glossy, well-produced, stylish publication which is both informative and interesting and has been well received by its reader base since its first issue back in May 2006. 3008 Docklands Magazine has a significant online following.

Response and reception

The planning of Docklands has raised a large amount of public debate and the area has created significant controversy, particularly the failed Ferris wheel.

In 1999, Melbourne City Council Director of Projects criticised the disconnection of the precinct to the CBD, claiming that the lack of transport links, particularly pedestrian, meant Docklands was "seriously flawed".

The problem was exacerbated in 2005, when the pedestrian link between Lonsdale Street and Docklands proposed in 2001 was cut from the final design of the Southern Cross Station development due to budget blowouts.

In 2006, Royce Millar of The Age referred to it as a "wasted opportunity".

In 2008, the City of Melbourne released a report which criticised Docklands' lack of transport and wind tunnel effect, lack of green spaces and community facilities.

In 2009, Neil Mitchell wrote for The Age declaring Docklands as a planning "dud". The Lord Mayor, Robert Doyle, has been openly critical of Docklands, claiming in 2009 that it lacks any form of "social glue".

However, despite the local criticism, in 2009, Sydney travel writer Mal Chenu described Melbourne Docklands as "the envy of Sydneysiders".

In 2010, VicUrban's general manager David Young acknowledged that Harbour Esplanade "doesn't stack up". Kim Dovey, professor of architecture and design at the University of Melbourne, added that Harbour Esplanade was "too big" and claimed that Docklands was "so badly done" that it required a "major rethink".

The Docklands area came under heavy criticism for the failure to provide a school with families being forced out of the area or needing to commute to state schools already under pressure from the critical shortage of schools in the inner suburbs. A private school, Melbourne City School, opened on King Street in 2010 but closed in 2012 due to low enrollments. Docklands Primary School in NewQuay opened in January 2021. The Docklands Sports Club has run Junior Football and Cricket programs since Summer 2019.

George Savvides, CEO of Medibank, which has been based in Docklands since 2004, has been critical of the area's lack of soul and amenity, but the company has nevertheless chosen to remain committed to the area.

Notable residents
 Sally Capp – 104th Lord Mayor of Melbourne
 Sam Newman – former AFL player and sportscaster

See also
 History of Melbourne Docklands
 Australia Award for Urban Design

References

Further reading
 Kim Dovey: Fluid City: Transforming Melbourne's Urban Waterfront, London: Routledge, 2005

External links

3008 Docklands Magazine Website
Docklands Community News
NewQuay website
Waterfront City website
Victoria Harbour website
Yarra's Edge website
Digital Harbour website
Victoria Online - Docklands Authority
Australian Places - Docklands
How public is your private? Article about Docklands by Martin Musiatowicz

Docklands
Docklands
Planned communities
Redeveloped ports and waterfronts in Australia
Docks (maritime)
Yarra River
2006 Commonwealth Games venues
Port of Melbourne